Mother Gnanamma Catholic College of Education (MGCCE) is one of the B.Ed institution located in Madathattuvilai, Kanyakumari district, Tamil Nadu, India. Mother Gnanamma Catholic College of Education is a Christian Minority Institution established in 2015 by St. Sebastian Educational & Development Trust. The college approved by (NCTE)National Council for Teacher Education and affiliated to (TNTEU)Tamil Nadu Teachers Education University, Chennai.

Courses Offered

The B.Ed courses in following are offered at MGCCE Madathattuvilai:

 Tamil
 English
 Mathematics
 Biological Science
 Physical Science
 Computer Science
 History
 Economics
 Commerce

Related Links
Official Websites
MGCCE
TNTEU
NCTE

See also
List of Colleges in Kanyakumari District

References
 http://www.ncte-india.org/appeal1/2013/Public%20Notice%20(muharram).pdf
 http://www.srcncte.in/Decisions%20and%20Minutes%202014/Decisions/Decision%20of%20261st%20%20SRC%20meeting%20-09-10th%20%20Feb,%202014.pdf
 http://www.mgcce.edu.in/about-us/

Colleges of education in Tamil Nadu
Christian universities and colleges in India
Universities and colleges in Kanyakumari district
Educational institutions established in 2015
2015 establishments in Tamil Nadu